Donald Gibson (born March 17, 1967) is a Canadian retired professional ice hockey player. He played in 14 games with the Vancouver Canucks during the 1990–91 NHL season.

Gibson was born in Deloraine, Manitoba. He played junior hockey with the Winkler Flyers in 1985–86 and was drafted by the Canucks in the 1986 Entry Draft. Gibson went to college at Michigan State University where he played for the Spartans. He became a professional after his graduation in 1990, playing for the Canucks' minor league affiliate Milwaukee Admirals. Gibson would play until 1994 with the Admirals, except for 14 games played with the Canuck in 1990–91.

Career statistics

Regular season and playoffs

All statistics are taken from NHL.com.

Awards and honours

References

External links

1967 births
Living people
Canadian ice hockey defencemen
Ice hockey people from Manitoba
Michigan State Spartans men's ice hockey players
Milwaukee Admirals (IHL) players
People from Deloraine, Manitoba
Vancouver Canucks draft picks
Vancouver Canucks players